The 1932 NFL season was the 13th regular season of the National Football League.

While the Boston Braves (the current Washington Commanders) joined the NFL in this season, the loss of the Providence Steam Roller, Cleveland Indians and Frankford Yellow Jackets dropped league membership to eight teams, the lowest in NFL history; the league also had eight teams in 1943 due to World War II.

While the Green Bay Packers had finished the season with 10 wins, the league title was determined at the time by winning percentage with ties excluded, meaning the Portsmouth Spartans and the Chicago Bears finished the season tied for first place (6-1, 0.857), ahead of Green Bay (10-3, 0.769).

Since both games between the Bears and Spartans had ended in ties, the NFL arranged for a playoff game to decide the NFL championship, the first ever game of its kind. 

Extremely cold weather forced the game to be moved from Wrigley Field to the indoor Chicago Stadium: as the makeshift football field in the stadium was only 80 yards long with undersized endzones, officials moved the goal posts to the goal line due to a lack of space to put them at the back of the end zone, as was standard in college and professional football. This change was favored by players and fans, and the goal posts were moved to the goal line as one of several rule changes the league made in 1933, with the rule lasting until 1973.

The Bears won the playoff game 9–0, which was scoreless until the fourth quarter. Since the playoff game counted in the final standings, the Spartans finished the season in third place behind runners-up Green Bay. 

The Spartans moved to Detroit, and became the Lions, in 1934.

Teams
The league decreased to eight teams in 1932.

Championship race
Following the 1932 season, the NFL would be split into two divisions (later two conferences), with the champions of each meeting in a championship game. 

This was the result of the conclusion of the 1932 season, where there was a tie for first place in the standings at the end of the regular season: as tied games did not count until 1972, the Spartans record of 6–1–4 and the Bears record of 6–1–6 were taken to be six wins, one loss, giving both teams an .857 win percentage.

Had pure win–loss differential or the current (post-1972) system of counting ties as half a win, half a loss been in place in 1932, the Packers' record of 10–3–1 (+7) would have won them a fourth consecutive championship, ahead of the Spartans' 6–1–4 (+5) and the Bears' 6–1–6 (+5).

The Green Bay Packers were unbeaten (8–0–1) after nine games, and after the Thanksgiving weekend, their 10–1–1 record (.909) was still well ahead of Portsmouth at 5–1–4 (.833) and Chicago at 4–1–6 (.800).  

In Week Twelve (December 4), the Spartans handed the Packers a 19–0 defeat, while the Bears beat the Giants 6–0. Portsmouth, at 6–1–4 (.857), took the lead, while the Packers (10–2–1) and the Bears (5–1–6) were tied for second (.833). 

In Week Thirteen, the Bears hosted the Packers; a Green Bay win would have seen the Packers finish second with an 11–2–1 record (.846) and hand Portsmouth their first ever title. The Bears beat the Packers 9–0, meaning the Bears finished at 6–1–6 (.857), and were tied for first with Portsmouth. 

Despite the fact that their December 18 game was referred to as a playoff, the Bears' 9–0 win over Portsmouth counted in the regular season standings: as such, while the Bears finished at 7–1–6 (.875) and won the 1932 title, it was the Packers who finished as runners-up, while the Spartans finished in third at 6–2–4 (.750).

Standings

Playoffs

League leaders

References
 NFL Record and Fact Book
 NFL History 1931–1940 (Last accessed December 4, 2005)
 Total Football: The Official Encyclopedia of the National Football League

National Football League seasons